GGP may refer to:
 Gan–Gross–Prasad conjecture, a conjecture in number theory
 Garden Grove Playhouse, a former theater group in Orange County, California
 Gateway-to-Gateway Protocol
 General game playing, in artificial intelligence
 General Growth Properties, since 2018 part of Brookfield Properties
 Generations and Gender Programme of the United Nations Economic Commission for Europe 
 Georgia Green Party, a state-level political party in the U.S.
 Global Goods Partners, a fair-trade nonprofit organization
 Golden Gate Park in San Francisco
 Gondwana Ganatantra Party, an Indian political party
 Good guidance practice
 Guernsey pound, the currency of Guernsey
 Logansport/Cass County Airport, in Indiana
 nProtect GameGuard Personal 2007, security software